Gol Pasha (also Romanized as Gol Pāshā; also known as Kal Pāshā Mey-e Soflá and Kal Pāshā-ye Soflá) is a village in Bala Larijan Rural District, Larijan District, Amol County, Mazandaran Province, Iran. At the 2006 census, its population was 36, in 10 families.

References 

Populated places in Amol County